The Dudley H. Davis Center (also known as the Davis Center) at the University of Vermont was the first student center in the United States to receive a U.S. Green Building Council Leadership in Energy and Environmental Design (LEED) Gold certification.  The building is a four-story structure with a floor area between 186,000 and 202,954 ft2.

Upon its completion in 2007, the Davis Center replaced the Billings Memorial Library as the university's main student center.

References

External links 
 

Buildings at the University of Vermont
School buildings completed in 2007
2007 establishments in Vermont